The Special Operations Group is the police tactical unit of the Public Security Police (PSP), the national police force of Portugal. GOE was created in 1982 and has around 200 operatives. Although a police unit, the GOE is employed worldwide, similar to the French GIGN or to the German GSG 9.

History 
In 1978, Quinta das Águas Livres in Sintra was acquired and the construction works of the infrastructures necessary to organise the instruction activities and to accommodate the distinct elements that would form a future operational group began.
Alongside, also began studies regarding the creation of the GOE and, with the co-operation of the British government, thanks to the efforts of Mota Pinto's government, elements of the 22nd Special Air Service Regiment (SAS) came to Portugal to train and start the formation of a police group able to conduct anti-terrorist missions.

On March 29, 1982, the first COE – Curso de Operações Especiais (Special Operations Course) began (not to be mistaken with CTOE's COE). The course ended on November 18 of the same year; the unit was considered to be totally operational and with an intervention capability since the end of 1982, although it was formally created in 1979. As a result of that approach between the British SAS and the Portuguese GOE, the pictures of the first agents are hard to distinguish between British and Portuguese since their uniforms, equipment and weaponry are identical. Later, GOE, still maintaining a strong relationship with the SAS, also began training with the US Delta Force, Germany's GSG 9, Spain's Guardia Civil Anti-Terrorist units, Ireland's Garda ERU, and Israeli Anti-Terrorist units. GOE is also part of the European ATLAS Network.

GOE's capabilities were put to the test in June, 1983, when Armenian commandos, using rented cars, invaded the residence of the Turkish ambassador and wounded a PSP officer who was part of the embassy's security team, holding the rest of the people there hostage. The Prime-Minister, Mario Soares, gave the green light to GOE to storm the building. Before this could be attempted, the terrorists accidentally blew themselves up, resulting in 5 dead terrorists and 2 casualties (the chargé d'affaires' wife and a policeman).

Since that moment, the missions assigned to the unit became more diverse and demanding. After 1991, GOE operational elements, together with ex-operators, began missions of protection of diplomatic representatives and installations in foreign countries where there are unstable situations or armed conflicts.
The level of operators deployed to those scenarios depends on the situation. GOE also intervenes if the evacuation of Portuguese citizens is needed: in 1992 in Luanda (Angola), in 1991 and 1997 in the Democratic Republic of the Congo (former Zaire) and in other countries like Guinea-Bissau, Algeria, Macau, Bosnia and, in 2011, in Egypt.

In those missions, they had to face attempts of forced entry into the diplomatic delegations by armed militants; the most serious being the missions that happened in 1997 in Zaire and in 1998 in Guinea; in the latter a grenade was launched into the embassy building where the security team was. In 2005 they were sent to Saudi Arabia and Iraq to protect the Portuguese embassies and personnel in both countries. Some were also sent into Timor-Leste in 2006.
Since 2006, the unit has the support of police elements from the famous Intervention Corps (Corpo de Intervenção, riot police unit) in the security of the Portuguese Embassies in Iraq and East-Timor. In August 2008 they were also assigned to end a robbery with hostages taking place in a Campolide, Lisbon branch of the Portuguese bank Banco Espírito Santo, involving two illegal immigrant armed robbers with Brazilian citizenship and six hostages.  According to a statement from the superintendent of PSP Florbela Carrilho, after several hours of negotiations, the GOE was forced to intervene, successfully taking out one of the robbers with a sniper shot to the heart, and injuring the other with one shot through the jaw. All hostages were released, four of them shortly after the beginning of the negotiations, while the other two hostages, including a bank manager were held until the end. This intervention was generally considered very successful.

Missions

 Counter-terrorism
 Hostage rescue
 High-risk arrest warrants and searches
 VIP protection
 Embassy and diplomatic security in dangerous countries
 Evacuation of Portuguese citizens from war-torn countries

Weapons
GOE officers may use a variety of firearms to complete missions.

 Handguns

 : Glock 17
 : Glock 19
 : SIG Sauer GSR - chambered in the .45 ACP
 : SIG Sauer SP 2022
 : Desert Eagle in .357 Magnum

 Shotguns

 : Benelli M4
 : Fabarm SDASS Tactical

 Submachine guns

 : FN P90
 : HK MP5
 : HK UMP45

 Rifles

 : H&K 416A5
 : H&K G36
 : H&K G36C
 : SIG Sauer MCX
 : Accuracy International Arctic Warfare
 : Accuracy International AXMC
Vehicles

 : Mercedes-Benz Sprinter
 : Alpine Armoring PittBull FX armored car

Command
The unit is organized as follows:
Command
Support Services
UEI (Unidade Especial de Intervenção) - Special Intervention Unit, consisting of:
Command
Three GOI (Grupos Operacionais de Intervenção) - Intervention Operational Group (1st, 2nd and 3rd), each commanded by an officer and includes 20 to 25 elements
One GOT (Grupo Operacional Técnico) - Technical Operational Group (4th) responsible for instruction, handling explosives, police dogs and other technical instruments, such as cameras and night vision devices.

Macau GOE

As one of the past Portuguese colonies, Macau set up their special police unit in 1993 with the same name of Grupo de Operações Especiais.

Like the Hong Kong Special Duties Unit trained by the British Special Air Service, the Macau GOE works and trains similar to the Portuguese GOE, in which they respond to terrorism acts and engage heavily armed criminals in the Macau territory.

The Macau counterpart use similar armaments compared to the original GOE, such as the: 
 SIG Sauer P226
 SIG Sauer P228
 Glock 19
 Heckler & Koch MP5
 Heckler & Koch G36

But they also use some small arms unique to the Portuguese GOE, such as the:
 Brügger & Thomet MP9
 SIG SG 552 
 Franchi SPAS-15 
 SIG Sauer SSG 3000

They also use: 
 Smith & Wesson 37 mm gas launchers
 long batons 
 Flash-ball

See also
 List of police tactical units
 ATLAS Network

References

External links 

GOE page at the official PSP website (in Portuguese)
Video of the 2008 Lisbon bank robbery and the GOE action
Video of 1980s GOE in training
GOE in Baghdad (in Portuguese)

1982 establishments in Portugal
Special forces of Portugal
Law enforcement in Portugal
Non-military counterterrorist organizations
ATLAS Network